Auplopus is a large genus of spider wasps belonging to the subfamily Pepsinae of the spider wasp family Pompilidae, distributed throughout the world except for Antarctica.  Auplopus wasps have the gruesome habit of  amputating the legs of their spider prey before transporting it to the nest.

Species 
Species within Auplopus include

Auplopus albifrons (Dalman, 1823)
Auplopus architectus (Say 1836)
Auplopus alaris (Saussure 1867)
Auplopus alishanus Ishikawa 1967
Auplopus amazonus Wahis 2006
Auplopus appendiculatus (Gussakovskij 1932)
Auplopus arcuaticornis Wahis 2006
Auplopus bakeri (Banks 1934)
Auplopus banosensis Tsuneki 1988
Auplopus bimaculatus (Smith 1859)
Auplopus bipennis (Saussure 1867)
Auplopus blandus (Guerin 1830)
Auplopus caerulescens (Dahlbom, 1843)
Auplopus carbonarius (Scopoli, 1763)
Auplopus carinatus Tsuneki 1988
Auplopus cebuensis Tsuneki 1988
Auplopus celaeno (Smith 1857)
[[Auplopus clypeatus]] Dreisbach 1963
Auplopus commendabilis (Kohl, 1894)
Auplopus constructor (Smith 1873)
Auplopus cyanellus Wahis 1992
Auplopus domesticus (Taschenberg 1872)
Auplopus dreisbachi Wahis 1986
Auplopus enodans (Kohl, 1894)
Auplopus erythropus (Brethes 1910)
Auplopus esaki （Yasumatsu）
Auplopus eucharis Wahis 1992
Auplopus fasciatus (Fabricius 1775)
Auplopus femoratus (Fabricius, 1805)
Auplopus funerator Wahis 1992
Auplopus gnoma (Cameron 1902)
Auplopus himalayensis (Cameron 1905)
Auplopus hombukeanus Tsuneki 1989
Auplopus hoorai Tsuneki 1989
Auplopus hypsipyla (Bingham 1893)
Auplopus ichnusus Wolf, 1960
Auplopus imitabilis Wahis 1992
Auplopus kinabalensis Tsuneki 1988
Auplopus krombeini Wahis 1992
Auplopus kuanghuanus Tsuneki 1989
Auplopus kuarensis Tsuneki 1989
Auplopus kyotensis （Yasumatsu）
Auplopus laeviculus (Bingham 1897)
Auplopus lankaensis Wahis 1992
Auplopus mandshuricus Lelej 1990
Auplopus maroccanus Priesner 1967
Auplopus mellipes (Say 1836)
Auplopus micromegas (Saussure 1867)
Auplopus militaris (Lynch-Arribalzaga 1873)
Auplopus mindanaoensis Tsuneki 1988
Auplopus montanus Alayo 1974
Auplopus murotai Tsuneki 1989
Auplopus mutabilis (Smith 1870)
Auplopus nabori Alayo 1974
Auplopus nambui Tsuneki 1989
Auplopus nantaror Tsuneki 1988
Auplopus nigrellus (Banks 1912)
Auplopus nigrescens Tsuneki 1988
Auplopus nitidiventris (Smith 1860)
Auplopus nozakae Tsuneki 1990
Auplopus nyemitawa ((Rohwer, 1919)
Auplopus obtusus (Perez 1905)
Auplopus optabilis Wahis 2008
Auplopus pacificus Lelej 1990
Auplopus pempuchiensis Tsuneki 1989
Auplopus persephone (Banks 1934)
Auplopus pygialis (Perez, 1905)
Auplopus pumilio (Arnold, 1934)
Auplopus rectus (Haupt, 1926)
Auplopus rufocinctus (Smith, 1855)
Auplopus semialatus (Williams, 1919)
Auplopus smithi Dalla Torre
Auplopus taino Snelling & Torres 2004
Auplopus takachihoi Yasumatsu 1943
Auplopus thailandinus Tsuneki 1988
Auplopus tibialis Lepeletier 1845
Auplopus tinctus (Smith 1855)
Auplopus tsunekii Wahis 1992
Auplopus viridicans Wahis 2003
Auplopus williamsi (Rohwer 1919)
Auplopus yaeyamaensis Shimizu 1986
Auplopus yasumatsui Lelei 1995
Auplopus zulu Dalla Torre 1897

References

Hymenoptera genera
Pepsinae